The Hathibada Ghosundi Inscriptions, sometimes referred simply as the Ghosundi Inscription or the Hathibada Inscription, are among the oldest known Sanskrit inscriptions in the Brahmi script, and dated to the 2nd-1st-century BCE.

Description
Dated to the 1st-century BCE, the Hathibada Ghosundi Inscriptions are among the oldest known Sanskrit inscriptions in Brahmi script from the Hindu tradition of ancient India, particularly Vaishnavism. Some scholars, such as Jan Gonda, have dated these to the 2nd century BCE.

The Hathibada Ghosundi Inscriptions were found in the same area, but not exactly the same spot. One part was discovered inside an ancient water well in Ghosundi, another at the boundary wall between Ghosundi and Bassi, and the third on a stone slab in the inner wall of Hathibada. The three fragments are each incomplete, but studied together. They are believed to have been displaced because the Mughal emperor Akbar during his seize of Chittorgarh camped at Nagari, built some facilities by breaking and reusing old structures, a legacy that gave the location its name "Hathi-bada" or "elephant stable". The part discovered in the Hathibada wall has the same style, same Brahmi script, and partly same text as the Ghosundi well text, thereby suggesting a link.

Religious significance
The inscription is significant not only for its antiquity but as a source of information about ancient Indian scripts, the society, its history and its religious beliefs. It confirms the ancient reverence of Hindu deities Samkarshana and Vāsudeva (also known as Balarama and Krishna), an existence of stone temple dedicated to them in 1st-century BCE, the puja tradition, and a king who had completed the Vedic Asvamedha sacrifice. The inscription also confirms the association of the two deities Samkarshana and Vāsudeva with Narayana (Vishnu), possibly a step in their full incorporation into the Vaishnavite pantheon as avatars of Vishnu.

Taken together with independent evidence such as the Besnagar inscription found with Heliodorus pillar,  the Hathibada Ghosundi Inscriptions suggest that one of the roots of Vaishnavism in the form of Bhagavatism was thriving in ancient India between the 2nd and 1st century BCE. They are not the oldest known Hindu inscription, however. Others such as the Ayodhya Inscription and Nanaghat Cave Inscription are generally accepted older or as old.

Inscription
The discovered inscription is incomplete, and has been restored based on Sanskrit prosody rules. It reads:

Fragment A 
1 .....𑀢𑀸𑀦 𑀕𑀚𑀬𑀦𑁂𑀦 𑀧𑀭𑀰𑀸𑀭𑀺𑀧𑀼𑀢𑁆𑀭𑁂𑀡 𑀲..
2.....𑀚𑀺𑀦𑀸 𑀪𑀕𑀯𑀪𑁆𑀬𑀁 𑀲𑀁𑀓𑀭𑁆𑀱𑀡 𑀯𑀸𑀲𑀼𑀤𑁂𑀯𑀸𑀪𑁆𑀬𑀁
3.....𑀪𑁆𑀬𑀁 𑀧𑀽𑀚𑀰𑀺𑀮𑀸  𑀧𑁆𑀭𑀓𑀸𑀭𑁄 𑀦𑀸𑀭𑀸𑀬𑀡 𑀯𑀸𑀝𑀺𑀓𑀸

1 ..... tēna Gājāyanēna P(ā)rāśarlputrāṇa Sa- 
2 ..... [j]i[nā] bhagavabhyāṁ Saṁkarshaṇa-V[ā]sudēvābhyā(ṁ) 
3 ......bhyāṁ pūjāśilā-prākārō Nārāyaṇa-vāṭ(i)kā.

Fragment B

1 .....𑀢𑁆𑀭𑁂𑀡 𑀲𑀭𑁆𑀯𑀢𑀸𑀢𑁂𑀦 𑀅𑀰𑁆𑀯𑀫𑁂𑀥𑀸...
2.... 𑀲𑀭𑁆𑀯𑁂𑀲𑁆𑀯𑀸𑀭𑀪𑁆𑀬𑀁 

1. ....[tr](ē)(ṇa) Sarvatātēna As[v]amēdha.... 
2 .....sarvēśvarābh(yāṁ).

Fragment C

1....𑀯𑀸𑀢𑀸𑀦 𑀕𑀚𑀬𑀦𑁂𑀦 𑀧𑀭𑀰𑀸𑀭𑀺𑀧𑀼𑀢𑁆𑀭𑁂𑀡 𑀲𑀭𑁆𑀯𑀢𑀸𑀢𑁂𑀦 𑀅𑀰𑁆𑀯𑀫𑁂𑀥𑀸 𑀬𑀚𑀺𑀦 
2....𑀡 𑀯𑀸𑀲𑀼𑀤𑁂𑀯𑀸𑀪𑁆𑀬𑀁 𑀅𑀦𑀺𑀳𑀸𑀢𑁂𑀪𑁆𑀬𑀁 𑀲𑀭𑁆𑀯𑁂𑀲𑁆𑀯𑀸𑀭𑀪𑁆𑀬𑀁 𑀧𑀽𑀚𑀰𑀺𑀮𑀸  𑀧𑁆𑀭𑀓𑀸𑀭𑁄 𑀦𑀸𑀭𑀸𑀬𑀡 𑀯𑀸𑀝𑀺𑀓𑀸

1 ....vat(ēna) [Gā]j(ā)yan[ē]na P(ā)r(āśarīpu)t(rē)ṇa [Sa](r)[vatā]tēna Aś(vamē)[dha](yā)- [j](inā)
2 ....(ṇa)-V(ā)sudēvābh[y]ā(ṁ) anihatā(bhyāṁ) sa(r)v(ē)[ś]va[r](ā)bh(yāṁ) p(ū)[j](ā)- [ś](i)l(ā)-p[r]ā[k]ārō Nār[ā]yaṇa-vāṭ(i)[k](ā).

– Ghosundi Hathibada Inscriptions, 1st-century BCE

Restoration 

Bhandarkar proposed that the three fragments suggest what the complete reading of fragment A might have been. His proposal was:

Fragment A (extrapolated)
1 (Karito=yam rajna Bhagava)tena Gajayanena Parasariputrena Sa- 
2 (rvatatena Asvamedha-ya)jina bhagava[d*]bhyaih Samkarshana-Vasudevabhyam
3 (anihatabhyarh sarvesvara)bhyam pujasila-prakaro Narayana-vatika.
– D. R. Bhandarkar

Translations
Bhandarkar – an archaeologist, translates it as,

Harry Falk – an Indologist, states that the king does not mention his father by name, only his mother, and in his dedicatory verse does not call himself raja (king). The king belonged to a Hindu Brahmin dynasty of Kanvas, that followed the Hindu Sungas dynasty. He translates one of the fragments as:

Benjamín Preciado-Solís – an Indologist, translates it as:

Sarvatata

Within the inscriptions, a local sovereign king of Madhyamika (modern day Nagari, Rajasthan) named Sarvata is mentioned. According to inscriptions, he performed the Ashvamedha Yajana and also constructed a Narayana-vatika compound dedicated to Samkarshana and Vāsudeva. Some scholars consider him to have been a part of the Kanva dynasty. Inscription which names Gajayana as his gotara or dynasty name, though it also is unclear. The same inscription also names his mother's gotra as Parasari or Parāśara.

References

2nd-century BC inscriptions
1st-century BC inscriptions
Sanskrit inscriptions in India
Indian inscriptions
Udaipur